Jude Aneke  (born April 23, 1990, in Enugu) is a Nigerian forward playing for Ikorodu United F.C.

Career
He started his career at Young Planners FC and Ebonyi Angels F.C. before moving to Anambra United.

Aneke joined Kaduna United during the 2009-10 season from lower division side Anambra United and scored 13 goals in all competitions, including 10 in the league. He won the 2010 Nigerian FA Cup with the club.

In November 2011, Aneke broke the 1-year-old record of Ahmed Musa by scoring his 19th and 20th goal in league play. A week later, he was called up to the Nigeria national football team to replace an injured Peter Odemwingie.

In 2012, Aneke joined Warri Wolves, before transferring to Al-Masry, off Port Said, Egypt, in August of that year.

Aneke got interest from Clubs in Turkish Premier League and also from giant Romanian Rapid Bucarest. On 18 July 2014, Aneke signed for Kazakhstan Premier League side FC Spartak Semey.

He returned to Nigeria and in June 2016 signed for Plateau United.
In 2017 he signed for Ikorodu United.

Achievements

Nigerian Super Cup
Winner (1): 2010

Honours
Nigeria Premier League Top Scorer (1): 2012

References

1990 births
Living people
Nigerian footballers
2011 CAF U-23 Championship players
Nigeria Professional Football League players
Association football forwards
Anambra United F.C. players
Footballers from Enugu